Proselotis apicipunctella is a moth of the family Gelechiidae. It was described by Stainton in 1859. It is found in India (Bengal).

The forewings are dull-ochreous, veined with darker, with some scattered blackish atoms, and an elongate black dot on the disc before the middle. A row of black dots goes around the acute apex. The hindwings are pale grey, darker at the base.

References

Moths described in 1859
Proselotis